is a private university in Takahashi, Okayama, Japan, established in 1990.

External links
 Official website 
 Official Website    ( English )
 http://kiui.jp/pc/english/index.html

Educational institutions established in 1990
Private universities and colleges in Japan
Universities and colleges in Okayama Prefecture
Kansai Collegiate American Football League
1990 establishments in Japan